Sulgheh (also Romanized as Sūlgheh; also known as Sūlqeh) is a village in Mangur-e Sharqi Rural District, Khalifan District, Mahabad County, West Azerbaijan Province, Iran. At the 2006 census, its population was 197, in 24 families.

References 

Populated places in Mahabad County